Kawkab is a Syrian village in the Qatana District of the Rif Dimashq Governorate. Kawkab is Arabic for "planet". According to the Syria Central Bureau of Statistics (CBS), Kawkab had a population of 1,188 in the 2004 census.

History
In 1838, Eli Smith noted it as a  village, located in Wady 'el-Ajam, between Damascus and the Hauran.

On 30 September, 1918 Kawkab was the site of the World War I successful "Charge at Kaukab" of the Australian 4th and 12th Light Horse Regiments directed against dug-in German and Ottoman remnants of the Seventh and Eighth Armies, joined by units from Damascus.

References

Bibliography

 

Populated places in Qatana District